Banner Marsh State Fish and Wildlife Area is an Illinois state park covering  in Fulton County, Illinois, United States.

History 
From 1910 to 1958, the former bottomland lake and marsh were leveed and drained for farming.

From the late 1880s to the mid-1980s, approximately 90% of the site was strip-mined for coal.

The Illinois Department of Natural Resources purchased the land in the 1980s. The Illinois Department of Natural Resources partnered with the U.S. Army Corps of Engineers on a reclamation project that was completed in May 2003. The project optimized the habitat for wildlife (fish and waterfowl), improved flood control, and increased food and cover for wildlife.

Flora and fauna

Flora 
The park borders the Illinois River and contains over 200 water bodies that serve as a freshwater marsh habitat for wildlife. The land contains scattered deep-water lakes, floodplain forests, levees, shallow marshes, and extensive grasslands.

Some species of native flora include:

 American lotus
 Swamp milkweed

Fauna 
Banner Marsh State Fish and Wildlife Area is home to migrating and local waterfowl, fish, and other native wildlife.

Some of the native species include:  waterfowl such as duck, goose; dove, quail, pheasant, rabbit, deer, and coyote.

Birds 
Banner Marsh State Fish and Wildlife Area is an important stopover site for many migratory birds. The Audubon Society has chosen it as an Important Bird Area. It also supports breeding populations for wetland and grassland birds. Some of the species of birds include:

 American Bittern
 American White Pelican
 Bald Eagle
 Bell's Vireo
 Black Rail
 Black-crowned Night-Heron 
 Blue-winged Teal
 Bobolink
 Double-crested Cormorant
 Great Egret
 Henslow's Sparrow
 Hooded Merganser
 King Rail
 Least Bittern
 Mallard
 Northern Harrier
 Orchard Oriole
 Osprey
 Pied-billed Grebe
 Rough-legged Hawk
 Sedge Wren
 Shorebirds
 Short-eared Owl
 Terns
 Virginia Rail

Butterflies 
Native plants provide a habitat for butterflies.

 Monarch Butterfly
 Spangled Fritillary butterflies
 Viceroy Butterfly

Fish 
Some of the species of fish include:

 Largemouth bass
 Smallmouth bass
 Northern pike
 Walleye 
 Crappie
 Bluegill
 Redear
 Green sunfish
 Channel cat.

References

External links
 U.S. Geological Survey Map at the U.S. Geological Survey Map Website. Retrieved January 14, 2023.

State parks of Illinois
Protected areas of Fulton County, Illinois